Alviks IK are a Swedish football team in Alvik, Luleå Municipality. They play in Division 2 Norrland.

Background

Alviks IK was formed on 5 February 1934. The club has played in the lower tiers of the Swedish football league system mainly in Division 3 and 4 in recent years. However, in the 2009 season they played in the Division 2 Norrland where they finished in tenth position after which they were relegated following the relegation playoff. They won the promotion to the Division 2 Norrland again after finishing 1st in the 2012 season in the Division 3. Alviks IK ladies team has played one season in the Damallsvenskan, in 2002.

Season to season

Attendances

In recent seasons Alviks IK have had the following average attendances:

Staff and board members

2021
 Alexandra Burman – Chairman of the board
 Anders N.O. Eriksson – Cashier & Vice Chairman
 Bengt Nyström
 Per-Erik Johansson
 Anders X. Eriksson
 Mattias Israelsson
 Yvonne Wallo
 Eleonor Lundkvist
 Tommy Mörsare

2013
  Bengt Nysrtöm - Chairman of the board
  Kenth Hansson - Vice Chairman
  Anders Eriksson - Secretary
  Lars Sandberg - Cashier

External links
  Alviks IK Official Website

Footnotes

Football clubs in Norrbotten County
Association football clubs established in 1934
1934 establishments in Sweden